Aniceto Silva Simões (born 8 September 1945) is a Portuguese long-distance runner. He competed in the men's 5000 metres at the 1976 Summer Olympics.

References

1945 births
Living people
Athletes (track and field) at the 1976 Summer Olympics
Portuguese male long-distance runners
Olympic athletes of Portugal
Place of birth missing (living people)